The UK Albums Chart is a weekly record chart based on album sales from Sunday to Saturday in the United Kingdom; during the 1980s, a total of 184 albums reached number one.

Number ones

By artist

Ten artists spent 10 weeks or more at number one on the album chart during the 1980s.

By record label
Six record labels spent 20 weeks or more at number one on the album chart during the 1980s.

Christmas number ones

In the UK, Christmas number one albums are those that are at the top of the UK Albums Chart on Christmas Day. Typically, this will refer to the album that was announced as number one on the Sunday before 25 December—when Christmas Day falls on a Sunday itself, the official number one is considered by the OCC to be the one announced on that day's chart. During the 1980s, the following albums were Christmas number ones.

Notes

References

External links
Archive of all UK Number One Albums of the 1980s with images of original packaging
Official UK Albums Top 100 at the Official Charts Company

1980s in British music
United Kingdom Albums
1980s